Rana Raslan (born ) is an Israeli former model who won Miss Israel in 1999. With the cancellation of the pageant in 2022, she remains the only Arab and Muslim to have won the title. Following her crowning as national beauty queen, Raslan represented Israel at Miss Universe that same year.

Concurrent Israeli prime minister Benjamin Netanyahu hailed Raslan's first-place nomination as a "clear manifestation of equality and cooperation between Jews and Arabs in Israel" and criticized the assertion that Arabs are treated as second-class citizens under Israeli law.

Early and personal life 
Raslan was born on 17 March 1977 in Wadi Nisnas, a neighbourhood in the city of Haifa; her father is an Arab Muslim and her mother is an Arab Christian who converted to Islam.

She has described herself as a "secular Muslim" in response to accusations of immorality by Muslim fundamentalists—specifically in reference to the beauty pageants' usage of swimsuits.

In 2003, Raslan relocated to Dubai after her marriage to an Emirati businessman.

See also

Lucy Aharish, Arab-Israeli journalist and actress
Huda Naccache, Arab-Israeli model
Lucy Ayoub, Arab-Israeli journalist
Mira Awad, Arab-Israeli musical artist

References

External links
 Israel beauty queens since 1950

1978 births
Arab citizens of Israel
Israeli female models
Israeli Muslims
Living people
Miss Israel winners
Miss Universe 1999 contestants
Islam and secularism